Manciano is a town and comune in the southern part of the province of Grosseto, Tuscany, central Italy. It has a population of about 7,200.

History 

Manciano was once a fairly important market town for the area of the Albegna and Fiora valleys, with a stronghold already recorded in the twelfth century. A brief occupation by Siena (1419–55) left the town an imposing fortress built around 1424.

Government

Frazioni 
The municipality is formed by the municipal seat of Manciano and the villages (frazioni) of:
 Marsiliana 
 Montemerano
 Poderi di Montemerano
 Poggio Capanne
 Poggio Murella
 San Martino sul Fiora 
 Saturnia.

Main sights

The most important site in the comune is Saturnia, an old Etruscan town with medieval walls, remains of a Roman road, and best known for its thermal springs dating to the Roman period and still in use today. The comune is further known to students of Late Antiquity as the place where the famous silver platter of Ardabur Aspar, consul in 434, was found (in the Fosso Castione, a creek near Marsiliana).

The densely built town centre of the frazione Montemerano, crowned by its leaning tower of San Lorenzo, is contained within its ancient walls. Montemerano became a power center of the signori dei Baschi, who dominated the comune. The thirteenth-century church is dedicated to San Lorenzo; frescoes remain on its walls, and a polyptych by the Sienese painter Sano di Pietro. At a short distance, in open countryside, there is the church of Madonna del Castuzzo.

See also
Saturnia
Terme di Saturnia
Pietro Aldi

References

External links

Montemerano.info

Manciano